Mohd Nazri bin Mohd Kamal (born 2 April 1987) is a Malaysian footballer who plays for Manjung City in Malaysia M3 League. His preferred position is as a winger.

Career
Nazri started his professional career in Perak Youth Squad. Starting from the 2009 season, he was one of several Perak youth players promoted to main squad after the exodus of Perak players to other teams. He was Perak's top scorer in the 2010 league season, with six goals.

He joined Sarawak FA for the 2015 season.

References

External links
 Mohd Nazri profile at Seladang.net
 

1987 births
Living people
Malaysian footballers
Perak F.C. players
PDRM FA players
Sarawak FA players
People from Perak
Malaysia Super League players
Association football wingers